Colorado's 17th Senate district is one of 35 districts in the Colorado Senate. It has been represented by Democrat Sonya Jaquez Lewis since 2021, succeeding appointed Democrat Mike Foote, who chose not to seek re-election.

Geography
District 17 is based in eastern Boulder County, covering Lafayette, Louisville, most of Longmont, and parts of Erie.

The district is split between Colorado's 2nd and 4th congressional districts, and overlaps with the 11th, 12th, and 33rd districts of the Colorado House of Representatives.

Recent election results
Colorado state senators are elected to staggered four-year terms; under normal circumstances, the 17th district holds elections in presidential years.

2020
In 2018, Senator Matt Jones was elected to the Boulder County Board of County Commissioners, and then-State Rep. Mike Foote was chosen to replace him in the Senate. Foote chose not to seek a full term in 2020, however, and his successor in the State House, Sonya Jaquez Lewis, ran instead.

2016

2012

Federal and statewide results in District 17

References 

17
Boulder County, Colorado